The sixth season of the sitcom Mom began on September 27, 2018, and concluded on May 9, 2019 on CBS in the United States. The season is produced by Chuck Lorre Productions and Warner Bros. Television, with series creators Chuck Lorre, Eddie Gorodetsky and Gemma Baker serving as executive producer.

Christy (Anna Faris) has gone back to school and is pursuing her dream of becoming a lawyer, while Bonnie (Allison Janney) attempts to have a healthy romantic relationship with her fiancé, Adam (William Fichtner). Through it all, Christy and Bonnie rely on their support system from AA, including the wise Marjorie (Mimi Kennedy), the wealthy and sometimes misguided Jill (Jaime Pressly), the overly emotional Wendy (Beth Hall), and the loudmouth but sweet Tammy (Kristen Johnston). Christy's daughter Violet made her final appearance on this show in the episode "Jell-O Shots and the Truth about Santa". Collectively, they help each other stay sober in the face of whatever life throws at them. The episodes are usually titled with two odd topics that are mentioned in that episode.

Season six of Mom aired Thursdays in the United States at 9:00 p.m. after Young Sheldon.

Cast

Main
 Anna Faris as Christy Plunkett
 Allison Janney as Bonnie Plunkett
 Mimi Kennedy as Marjorie Armstrong-Perugian
 Jaime Pressly as Jill Kendall
 Beth Hall as Wendy Harris
 William Fichtner as Adam Janikowski
 Kristen Johnston as Tammy Diffendorf

Recurring
 Lauri Johnson as Beatrice
 Yvette Nicole Brown as Nora Rogers
 Will Sasso as Andy
 Sam McMurray as Ned
 Susan Ruttan as Lucy
 French Stewart as Chef Rudy
 Rainn Wilson as Trevor Wells
 Sadie Calvano as Violet Plunkett
 Matt Jones as Baxter
 Reggie de Leon as Paul
 Chiquita Fuller as Taylor
 Charlie Robinson as Mr. Munson

Special guest stars
 Constance Zimmer as Professor Natalie Stevens
 Bradley Whitford as Mitch
 Nicole Sullivan as Leanne
 Lois Smith as Claire Dickinson

Guest stars
 Matt Oberg as Geoffrey
 John Rubinstein as Professor Addison
 Maya Lynne Robinson as Amanda
 Stephanie Erb as Louise
 Miller Tai as Matt
 Dan Martin as Juan
 Michelle Arthur as Belinda
 Eric Allan Kramer as Earl
 Cleo King as Sandy
 Michelle Ortiz as Stacy
 Alimi Ballard as Professor Gannon
 Caleb Pierce as Glen
 Amanda Perez as Lisa
 David Meunier as Yuri
 Anna Maria Horsford as Eve Ferguson
 Shea Buckner as Daniel
 Larry Joe Campbell as Mike
 Mike Lane as Mason
 Julie Claire as Vivian Prescott
 Stephanie McVay as Chelsea
 Gary Anthony Williams as Warren
 Ellie Reed as Mackenzie
 Konstantin Lavysh as Sergei
 Johnathan McClain as Mark
 Winston Story as Dane
 Andrew Ridings as Russell
 Amanda Carlin as Alice
 Rick Overton as Burt

Episodes

Ratings

References

Mom (TV series)
2018 American television seasons
2019 American television seasons